Appusami stories are a series of Tamil novels and short stories written by Bhagyam Ramasamy. The first story was published in Kumudam magazine in 1963. The stories have been in print for over four decades and many of them have been made into stage plays and Television shows. A Humour club in Chennai has been named as the "Appusami-Seethapatti Humour Trust" after the protagonists of the series.

Bagyam Ramasami
Bagyam Ramasami (also spelled as Bakkiyam Ramasamy) is the pseudonym of Ja. Ra. Sundaresan (1 September 1930 to 8 December 2017). He was born in Jalakandapuram, Salem district. His pen name is a combination of his mother's name (Bhagyam) and his father's (Ramasamy). His first breakthrough was the publication of the story Appusami and the African Beauty in Kumudam in 1963. Since then he has published a number of serialized novels, stage plays and short stories featuring the same set of characters. Some of the stories were published under various pen names including Yogesh, Vanamali, Selvamani, Mrinalini, Sivathanal, and Jwalamalini. He also worked as a journalist in Kumudam, eventually retiring in 1990 as its joint editor.

Books
About 30 novels and novellas of Appusami have been published so far. Most of them were serialised in Kumudam and then published in book form. They are all illustrated by painter Jeyaraj.

Appusami and the African Beauty
1001 Appusamiy Iravugal
Manavar Thalaivar Appusami
Appusamiyum Arupudha vilakkum
Pamara Geethai
Sundakkai Sithar Appusami
Appusami Padam Edukkirar
Berovin pinnal
August Thyagi Appusami
Seethapattiyin Sabadham
Veerappan kattil appusamy
Akasavaniyil Appusamy
Appusami Divorce Ketkirar
Come on Appusamy Come on
Human bomb Appusamy
Appusamiyin Colour TV
Appusamiyum Hypnotisa poonayum
Appusamiyum Azhagi pottiyum
Appusamiyin Thali bakkiyam
Appusamiyum Bharathi Narkaliyum

References

External links
 Official website of Appusami stories
 His books are available as ebooks at Pustaka.

Tamil novels
20th-century Indian novels
Novel series
Indian novels adapted into plays
Indian novels adapted into television shows